Cristian Valentin Ciubotariu (born 24 December 1980) is a Romanian professional footballer, who plays as a midfielder for German lower leagues club Edenkoben. Ciubotariu grew up at Sportul Studențesc and played in Romania for various teams in the Liga I and Liga II, such as: Sportul Studențesc, Rapid București, Dinamo București, Politehnica Iași or Unirea Urziceni, among others.

External links
 
 

1980 births
Living people
Romanian footballers
Footballers from Bucharest
Association football midfielders
Liga I players
FC Sportul Studențesc București players
FC Rapid București players
FC Dinamo București players
FC Politehnica Iași (1945) players
ACF Gloria Bistrița players
Liga II players
FC Vaslui players
FC Unirea Urziceni players
CS Concordia Chiajna players
FC Delta Dobrogea Tulcea players
Romanian expatriate footballers
Romanian expatriate sportspeople in Germany
Expatriate footballers in Germany